Feuquières is a commune in the Oise department in northern France. Feuquières-Broquiers station has rail connections to Beauvais and Le Tréport.

See also
 Communes of the Oise department

References

Communes of Oise